

Maximilian Jais (4 March 1891 – 24 January 1957) was a general during World War II. He was  a recipient of the Knight's Cross of the Iron Cross of Nazi Germany.

Awards and decorations

 Knight's Cross of the Iron Cross on 17 September 1941 as Oberst and commander of Gebirgsjäger-Regiment 141

References

Citations

Bibliography

 

1891 births
1957 deaths
People from the Kingdom of Bavaria
Military personnel from Munich 
German Army personnel of World War I
Recipients of the clasp to the Iron Cross, 1st class
Recipients of the Knight's Cross of the Iron Cross
German prisoners of war in World War II
Major generals of the German Army (Wehrmacht)